Downers Grove is a village in DuPage County, Illinois, United States. It was founded in 1832 by Pierce Downer, whose surname serves as the eponym for the village. Per the 2020 census, the population of the village was 50,247. It is a south-west suburb of Chicago. The village is located between I-88 and I-55.

History
Downers Grove was founded in 1832 by Pierce Downer, a farmer who traveled to Illinois from Rutland, New York, but was originally from Vermont. Its other early settlers included the Blodgett, Curtiss, Blanchard, Stanley, Lyman, and Carpenter families. The original settlers were mostly migrants from the Northeastern United States and Northern Europe. The first schoolhouse was built in 1844. In 1846, the Blodgett house was built by Israel and Avis Blodgett. It was the second (or third) home built in Downers Grove, and is of cultural significance as a former stop on the Underground Railroad. The cabin still stands, alongside Pierce Downer's original home on Maple Avenue, and is maintained by the Downers Grove Historical Society

The Chicago, Burlington and Quincy Railroad was extended from Aurora to Chicago through Downers Grove in 1864, boosting its population. The town was incorporated in March 1873. Its somewhat unusual spelling ("Apostrophe-free since 1873") remains a minor historical mystery.

In April 1947, the wreck of a Burlington Railroad Twin Cities Zephyr passenger train killed three people, including the engineer. The streamliner struck a large tractor which had fallen from a freight train and two passenger cars crashed through a wall of the Main Street Station.

The construction of two major toll roads along the village's northern and western boundaries, I-355 in 1989, and what is now referred to as I-88 in 1958, facilitated the village's access to the rest of Chicago metropolitan area. I-55 is not far from the south edge of the village. Downers Grove has developed into a bustling Chicago suburb with many diverse businesses, including the headquarters for Devry University, FTD, Ambitech Engineering Corp, Dover, Heartland Food Corporation, and HAVI Global Solutions.

Housing
The housing stock in Downers Grove comprises a mixture; some, generally near the center of town, date from the middle of the 19th century, but housing styles of each succeeding generation are represented. Downers Grove has witnessed one of the highest teardown rates in the Chicago area; small older residences are being demolished and replaced with much larger new houses. Teardowns have been the source of much controversy within the village. Since they occupy much more land than the original houses, rainwater that was originally absorbed by their yards is directed into neighboring yards and streets, resulting in flooding. Concerns have been raised that teardowns reduce affordable housing in the town and promote gentrification.

Geography

Only the DuPage County communities of Bartlett, Aurora, Naperville and Bolingbrook have larger land areas. Within the town are two forest preserves: Lyman Woods and Maple Grove Forest Preserve. A small creek runs through Maple Grove forest preserve. Downers Grove has been designated a Tree City USA 28 times by the National Arbor Day Foundation.

Downers Grove borders the communities of Oak Brook, Westmont, Darien, Lombard, Woodridge and Lisle.

Climate
Downers Grove is in a humid continental climate zone. On average, January is the coldest month, while July is the warmest month. August typically has the most precipitation, and February the least.

Demographics

As of the 2020 census, there were 50,327 people living in Downers Grove. The racial makeup of the village was 84.3% White alone (not Hispanic or Latino), 3.4% Black or African American alone, 0.1% American Indian and Alaska Native alone, 5.3% Asian alone, 0.0% Native Hawaiian and Other Pacific Islander alone, and 2.5% from two or more races. Hispanic or Latino were 5.0% of the population.

There were 20,115 households, with an average household size of 2.42 and an average family size of 3.09. 53.5% of family households included married couples living together, 16.2% had a male householder with no spouse present, and 26.1% had a female householder with no spouse present. Out of adults in the village, 55.2% were married (not separated), 5.9% were widowed, 9.8% were divorced, 0.7% were separated, and 28.5% were never married.

In the village, 5.9% of the population was under 5 years of age, with 21.5% under the age of 18, and 19.1% were 65 years of age or older. The median age was 43.1 years.

According to the 2020 American Community Survey, the Median Household Income in the village was $97,197. The median income for a family was $131,733, while the median income for a non-family household was $45,193. About 5.0% of the population were below the poverty line, including 2.6% of minors under age 18, 5.5% of adults aged 18–64, and 6.0% of seniors age 65 or over. The state of Illinois as a whole, has a $68,428 Median Household Income and a 12.0% poverty rate

Economy

Located 20 miles west of the Chicago Loop, Downers Grove residents commonly commute via the village's three Metra BNSF line stations or highway connections. The village itself also serves as headquarters for multiple businesses, including Advocate Aurora Health and Fortune 500 member Dover Corporation. The village is also home to regional satellite offices of numerous national corporations, including Microsoft, MetLife, and State Farm.

Downers Grove's retail economy is largely supported by the local section of Ogden Avenue. The stretch of Ogden Avenue through Chicago's western suburbs is particularly known for its automobile dealerships, classic car dealerships, and service centers. Ogden Avenue is also framed by a variety of grocery and convenience stores such as CVS, Fresh Thyme Farmers Market, Jewel, Trader Joe's, and Walgreens. Industrial and corporate parks may be found on Ogden's tributaries adjacent to major tollways such as I-355 or I-88.

Top employers
According to the Village's 2017 Comprehensive Annual Financial Report, the top employers in the city are:

Arts and culture

Architecture
About 25 Sears-Roebuck Catalog Homes are located in Downers Grove, built using purchased kits between 1908 and 1940. The Blodgett House (1846) was a stopover point on the Underground Railroad. The house has been moved to the Downers Grove Museum Campus.

Community events
The Tivoli Theatre and over 140 community events and festivals, attract thousands of visitors each year. Over  of parks for recreational use are available with 450 recreational activities are available throughout the year. On Friday nights throughout the summer, antique and specialty cars park downtown in an informal car show. The Indian Boundary YMCA sponsors an ice sculpture festival held in January.

Parks and recreation
Downers Grove contains a multitude of parks and forest preserves, including:

 Concord Square Park
 Davis Park
 Doerhoefer Park
 Ebersold Park
 Fishel Park
 Gilbert Park
 Hooper's Hollow Park
 Hummer Park
 Lee and Grant Park
 McCollum Park
 Memorial Park
 Milnes Family Memorial Park
 Ned Bell Park
 O'Brien Park
 Patriots Park
 Prince Pond
 Railroad Park (Defunct)
 Randall Park
 Ruth K. Powers Park
 Spring Park
 Wallingford Park
 Washington Park
 Whitlock Park
 Belmont Prairie
 Hidden Lake Forest Preserve
 Fox Hollow County Forest Preserve
 Lyman Woods Forest Preserve
 Maple Grove

Government

Local
The Village of Downers Grove operates under a magisterial council-manager form of government. The Village Council is the policy-making body that authorizes a professional manager to oversee the daily operations of the village. The Village Council is composed of the Mayor and six Commissioners elected at-large. In addition to the Municipal Code, which establishes many of the rules and regulations by which the Village operates, the Council has also adopted separate council policies on several matters related to municipal activities.

The Mayor of Downers Grove is Robert T. Barnett. The Commissioners of Downers Grove are Greg Hose, Nicole Walus, Leslie Sadowski-Fugitt, Rich Kulovany, Chris Gilmartin and Danny Glover. The Mayor and Commissioners are elected for four-year terms at odd-year Consolidated General Elections. The terms for Mayor Barnett and Commissioners Walus, Sadowski-Fugitt, and Kulovany expire in May 2023. The terms for Commissioners Hose, Gilmartin, and Glover expire in May 2025.

The elections for Mayor and Commissioners are non-partisan; the candidates' party affiliations do not appear on the ballot, and direct party funding is not traditionally practiced.

State and national
The majority of the Village of Downers Grove is within the 6th US Congressional District of Illinois. Downers Grove resident Sean Casten (Democrat) has represented the district since 2019. Portions of southwest Downers Grove are within 11th US Congressional District. This district is represented by Bill Foster (Democratic).

The majority of the Village of Downers Grove is within the Illinois Senate 41st Legislative District, which is represented by John Curran (Republican) as of 2017. A portion of northern Downers Grove is within the Illinois Senate 24th Legislative District, which is represented by Suzanne Glowiak (Democratic) as of 2019.

The majority of the Village of Downers Grove is within the Illinois House of Representatives 81st Representative District, which was represented by Ron Sandack (Republican) as of 2015. Sandack abruptly resigned in July 2016 citing issues with social media and "ugly" politics. In August, local Republican officials chose David S. Olsen, previously the mayor pro tem of Downers Grove, as the new Representative of the 81st District. In 2018, newcomer Anne Stava-Murray overcame David S. Olsen in the election with only approximately $30,000. Portions of northern Downers Grove are within the Illinois House of Representatives 47th Representative District, which is represented by Deanne Mazzochi (Republican) and the Illinois House of Representatives 48th Representative District, which is represented by Terra Costa Howard (Democratic).

In 2006, the July 4 parade in Downers Grove featured both of the major Illinois gubernatorial candidates at the time, Judy Baar Topinka (R) and Rod Blagojevich (D).

Education
Downers Grove is home to twelve public elementary schools, two public middle schools and two public high schools, Downers Grove North High School and Downers Grove South High School. Eleven of the elementary schools, including Hillcrest, Belle Aire, El Sierra, Kingsley, Fairmount, Highland, Whittier, Pierce Downer, Henry Puffer, Lester, and Indian Trail Schools and two of the middle schools-Herrick and O'Neill Middle School, are part of Downers Grove Grade School District 58. The other elementary schools, Prairieview and Elizabeth Ide and Lakeview Jr. High School, are part of Center Cass School District 66. Downers Grove has two Catholic Schools, St. Joseph's and St. Mary's of Gostyn, that enroll students from pre-school through 8th grade. 
The two high schools in Downers Grove, North and South, are part of Community High School District 99. They serve the entire community of Downers Grove, the majority of the village of Woodridge, and parts of Westmont, Darien, Lisle, Bolingbrook, Oak Brook and unincorporated Downers Grove and Lisle Townships.

Good Shepherd Lutheran School is a Christian Pre-K-8 school of the Wisconsin Evangelical Lutheran Synod in Downers Grove.

Downers Grove is home to the Avery Coonley School. Founded in 1906 and in its present location in Downers Grove since 1929, it is a private K-8 school, known for its math and science-oriented teaching as well as its focus on the arts and foreign language.

Downers Grove is also the home of Midwestern University, which trains osteopathic physicians and surgeons, physician assistants, pharmacists, physical therapists, occupational therapists, and dentists.

According to the American Community Survey 2010, Downers Grove has one of the nation's most educated citizenry, with 50.7% of individuals over the age of 25 holding bachelor's or advanced degrees; the national average is 27.9%.

Media
Newspaper; Downers Grove Suburban Life

Infrastructure

Transportation
The main line of the BNSF Railway Line, the line is also used by Metra commuter rail. Metra's BNSF Railway Line has three stops in Downers Grove at Belmont Road, Main Street, and Fairview Avenue. Interstate Highways 355 and 88 pass through the community, as well as the major surface street US 34-Ogden Avenue. Downers Grove is served by the Pace Bus Service, a system of suburban public transportation.

The Grove Commuter Shuttle runs four routes throughout the community to two of the three train station that are in the village. The shuttle also operates for the RotaryGrove Fest from remote parking lots on the north and south sides of the village located at the respective north and south high schools.

Utilities
Downers Grove drinking water comes from Lake Michigan, via the DuPage Water Commission pipeline, which purchases the water from the City of Chicago Department of Water Management. Its electricity infrastructure is largely maintained by Commonwealth Edison Company (ComEd); its natural gas infrastructure was built by Northern Illinois Gas.

Household waste pickup is contracted out by the village to Republic Services, as is yard waste pickup; these are paid for by either household-purchased stickers or rented carts. Curbside recycling is free.

Waste water is treated by the Downers Grove Sanitary District.

Notable people
 

 Muriel Anderson (b. 1960), composer and guitarist
 Henry Williams Blodgett (1821-1905), United States federal judge and Illinois state representative
 Bob Bryar (b. 1979), drummer for My Chemical Romance
 Nick Burdi (b. 1993), baseball player
 Greg Corner (b. 1974) bassist for Kill Hannah, co-host and musical director for JBTV
 Andy Dunn (b. 1979), CEO of Bonobos Inc.
David Edwards (b. 1997) is a professional football player for the Los Angeles Rams.
 Charles Draper Faulkner (1890-1979), architect
 Collin Fernandez (b. 1997), professional soccer player
 Lauren Frost (b. 1985), actress best known as Ruby Mendel in Disney Channel Original Series Even Stevens and Disney Channel Original Movie The Even Stevens Movie
 Cammi Granato (b. 1971), Olympic ice hockey champion, inductee in Hockey Hall of Fame
 Tony Granato (b. 1964), NHL player, head coach of Colorado Avalanche and University of Wisconsin
 Kendall Gretsch, paralympian
 Miles Harvey (b. 1960), journalist and author 
 F. Kenneth Iverson (1925–2002) CEO of Nucor Steel 
 Eric Jagielo (b. 1992), baseball player
 Nancy Johnson (b. 1974), 2000 Summer Olympics gold medalist in the 10 metre air rifle 
 Matt Jones (b. 1983), professional hockey player formerly with the Phoenix Coyotes (NHL)
 Dan LeFevour (b. 1987), professional quarterback for Hamilton Tiger-Cats of the Canadian Football League
 Fred Faulkner Lester (1926–1945), Hospital corpsman in the United States Navy and awardee of the Medal of Honor.
 Eric Lichaj (b. 1988), professional soccer player, currently with Hull City and also a member of the US national team
 Emil Martinec (b. 1958), string theorist
 Thomas McCracken Jr. (born 1952), Illinois state legislator and lawyer
 Jim McDermott (b. 1936), U.S. representative representing Washington's 7th congressional district from 1989 to 2017
 Sherrill Milnes (b. 1935), baritone, formerly with the Metropolitan Opera
 Sandi Morris (b. 1992), pole vaulter, silver medalist at 2016 Olympics and 2017 World Championships
 Edward F. Mrkvicka Jr. (b. 1944), lay minister and financial expert
 Bryan Mullins (b. 1987), former basketball player and current Men's Basketball head coach at Southern Illinois University
 Bill Novey (1948–1991), head of special effects at Walt Disney Imagineering
 Emo Philips (b. 1956), comedian
 Lanny Poffo (b. 1954), professional wrestler
 "Shorty" Powers (1922–1979), NASA spokesman for Project Mercury
 Joe Principe (b. 1974), bass guitarist for Rise Against
 Denise Richards (b. 1971), actress and former model, The World Is Not Enough, Wild Things, Denise Richards: It's Complicated
 John Ridgely (1909–1968), actor, The Big Sleep, Air Force, Destination Tokyo
 Johnny Sain (1917-2006), baseball pitcher, 6-time World Series champion; died in Downers Grove
 Randy Savage (1952-2011), Randall Mario Poffo, ring name "Macho Man", former professional wrestler and actor
 Luther Ely Smith (1873–1951), founder of the Gateway Arch National Park
 Barbara Stock (b. 1956), actress, Spenser: For Hire, Dallas
 Joseph Tumpach (1912-1968), Illinois state representative and motel owner
 Matthew West (b. 1977), contemporary Christian musician
Megan Callahan-Shah (b. 1985), 5-time Emmy Awards nominated writer for Saturday Night Live

See also

 List of towns and villages in Illinois

References

External links

 Village of Downers Grove

 
Villages in Illinois
Populated places on the Underground Railroad
Populated places established in 1832
Chicago metropolitan area
Villages in DuPage County, Illinois
1873 establishments in Illinois